Salcedo (IPA: [ˌsɐlˈsɛdo];), officially the Municipality of Salcedo,  is a 5th class municipality in the province of Eastern Samar, Philippines. According to the 2020 census, it has a population of 22,136 people.

History
During World War II the Salcedo was part of a large US Navy base Leyte-Samar Naval Base from 1944 to 1946. 
In 1959, the sitio of Balud was converted into a barrio.

Geography

Barangays
Salcedo is politically subdivided into 41 barangays.

Climate

Demographics

Economy

References

External links
 [ Philippine Standard Geographic Code]
 Philippine Census Information
 Local Governance Performance Management System

Municipalities of Eastern Samar